This is a list of settlements in the Preveza regional unit, Greece.

 Acherousia
 Agia
 Agios Georgios
 Ammoudia
 Andonia
 Ano Rachi
 Ano Skafidoti
 Anogeio
 Anthousa
 Assos
 Cheimadio
 Despotiko
 Dryofyto
 Ekklisies
 Filippiada
 Flampoura
 Galatas
 Gorgomylos
 Gymnotopos
 Kamarina
 Kanali
 Kanallaki
 Kastri
 Kerasona
 Kleisoura
 Koroni
 Koryfoula
 Kotsanopoulo
 Koukkouli
 Kranea
 Kryopigi
 Kypseli
 Livadari
 Louros
 Loutsa
 Meliana
 Mesopotamo
 Michalitsi
 Mouzakaiika
 Myrsini
 Mytikas
 Narkissos
 Nea Kerasounta
 Nea Sampsounta
 Nea Sinopi
 Neo Sfinoto
 Nikolitsi
 Nikopoli
 Oropos
 Panagia
 Pappadates
 Parga
 Petra
 Polystafylo
 Preveza
 Revmatia
 Riza
 Rizovouni
 Romia
 Skepasto
 Skiadas 
 Stavrochori
 Stefani
 Themelo
 Thesprotiko
 Trikastro
 Tsagkaropoulo
 Valanidorachi
 Valanidoussa
 Vouvopotamos
 Vrachos
 Vrysoula

By municipality

See also
List of towns and villages of Greece

Preveza
Communities